North Hamilton Dalrymple, 9th Earl of Stair (17769 November 1864) was the son of Sir John Dalrymple of Cousland, 4th Baronet (died 26 February 1810) and Elizabeth Hamilton.

He married, firstly, Margaret Penny on 27 May 1817. He married, secondly, Martha Willett Dalrymple, daughter of Colonel George Dalrymple and Martha Willett Miller, on 23 March 1831. He died on 9 November 1864.

Children
Lady Agnes Dalrymple
Sir John Hamilton Dalrymple, 10th Earl of Stair (b. 1 April 1819 - died 3 December 1903)

External links
Peerage site
Historic Scotland

Sources
Charles Mosley, editor, Burke's Peerage and Baronetage, 106th edition, 2 volumes (Crans, Switzerland: Burke's Peerage (Genealogical Books) Ltd., 1999), volume 2, page 2069.

1776 births
1864 deaths
Date of birth unknown
Earls of Stair
Place of birth missing